Copenhagen Business School (Danish: Handelshøjskolen i København) often abbreviated and referred to as CBS (also in Danish), is a public university situated in Copenhagen, Denmark and is considered one of the most prestigious business schools in Western Europe and the world.

CBS was established in 1917 by the Danish Society for the Advancement of Business Education and Research (FUHU); however, it was not until 1920 that accounting became the first full study programme at CBS. Today CBS has approximately 20,000 students and 2,000 employees, and offers a wide range of undergraduate and graduate programmes within business, typically with an interdisciplinary and international focus. CBS is accredited by EQUIS (European Quality Improvement System), AMBA (Association of MBAs), as well as AACSB (Association to Advance Collegiate Schools of Business), thus making it one of the few schools worldwide to hold the "triple-crown" accreditation, and along with Aarhus BSS, the only two in Denmark.

The CBS campus is located in Frederiksberg, close to the center of Copenhagen, and centers on the school's main campus of Solbjerg Plads, completed in 2000. Since the Danish Universities Act of 2003, CBS has had a board of directors with an external majority. The Board of Directors appoints the President of CBS, who is currently Nikolaj Malchow-Møller. Most of the programs are taught in English, and more than half of the faculty is recruited from abroad, making CBS an international academic environment.

The university's alumni include Søren Skou, CEO of A.P Moller-Maersk, Lise Kingo, executive director of the United Nations Global Compact, Fritz Henrik Schur Junior, Chairman of Ørsted, David Heinemeier Hansson, creator of Ruby on Rails, Kasper Rørsted, CEO of Adidas, Hannibal Muammar Gaddafi, son of former Libyan leader Muammar Gaddafi, Jacob Schram, CEO of Norwegian Air, Lars Dalgaard, founder of SuccessFactors, Thor Haraldsson, as well as several other entrepreneurs and Danish politicians.

History 
CBS was established in 1917 by the Danish Society for the Advancement of Business Education (now known as FUHU), which is a private educational institution. In 1965 the business school became integrated into the Danish educational system as an institution of higher education. Today, it is regulated by the Danish Universities Act of 2003.

Presidents

Programme structure 
CBS offers a comprehensive range of university degrees in economics and business administration. Other programmes combine business studies with social sciences and the humanities, offering education in the fields of IT, philosophy, politics, language, sociology, communication and others.

The selection of full-time programmes complies with the three levels:

 3-year bachelor's degree
 2-year master's degree
 3-year PhD

CBS also offers part-time and full-time programmes in continuing education:
 Executive Master Programmes
 Full-time MBA
 Diploma programmes and short courses

Bachelor programmes 
CBS offers 18 bachelor programmes, eight taught in English** and ten taught in Danish*, in business administration and international business communication.

 BSc in Business Administration and Commercial Law *
 BSc in Business Administration and Digital Management **
 BSc in Business Administration and Information Systems *
 BSc in Business Administration and Management Science *
 BSc in Business Administration and Market Dynamics and Cultural Analysis * (new programme in 2019)
 BSc in Business Administration and Organisational Communication *
 BSc in Business Administration and Philosophy *
 BSc in Business Administration and Project Management *
 BSc in Business Administration and Psychology *
 BSc in Business Administration and Service Management **
 BSc in Business Administration and Sociology **
 BSc in Business, Asian Language and Culture - International Business Asia **
 BSc in Business, Language and Culture **
 BSc in Economics and Business Administration *
 BSc in European Business *
 BSc in International Business **
 BSc in International Business and Politics **
 BSc in International Shipping and Trade **

Master's programmes 

CBS offers thirty-nine master's programmes, eleven taught in English** and twenty-eight taught in Danish*, in Social Science, Business Administration, Economics and Business Administration, International Business Communication, Language and Culture, etc. The largest master's programme is MSc in Economics and Business Administration with 14 concentrations and more than 3,000 students.

Exchange programmes 
CBS is the Danish member of CEMS - Global Alliance in Management Education and a member of Partnership in International Management (PIM), and focuses on double degree agreements with other top business schools. CBS has exchange and cooperation agreements with 390 universities and business schools around the world, half of which are European. 43% of CBS programmes are taught in English and CBS offers approximately 200 separate courses taught in English.

Partner universities and schools include, among others:
In the USA: Ross School of Business, Wharton School of the University of Pennsylvania, Boston University, New York University Stern School of Business, Northwestern University, University of California, Los Angeles, University of Michigan, Duke University, University of North Carolina at Chapel Hill, University of North Carolina at Charlotte, University of Texas at Austin, Emory University, University of Southern California, Texas A&M University, Columbia University, Cornell University, Indiana University, University of Minnesota, University of Wisconsin–La Crosse, University of Wisconsin–Madison, Purdue University, University of Maryland, College Park, University of Washington Business School, Washington University in St. Louis.
In Canada: McGill University, University of Western Ontario, University of British Columbia, HEC Montréal, University of Toronto, Toronto Metropolitan University, York University, Queen's University, University of Alberta School of Business, University of Calgary, Simon Fraser University.
In Europe: Bocconi University, London School of Economics, HEC Paris, Rotterdam School of Management, Erasmus University, Warwick Business School, ESADE, Manchester Business School, University of St. Gallen, Vienna University of Economics and Business, Stockholm School of Economics, Louvain School of Management, Aalto University School of Business, WHU – Otto Beisheim School of Management, ESSEC Business School, University of Mannheim, University College Dublin, Sciences Po Paris, Tilburg University, Norwegian School of Economics, EMLYON Business School, University of Navarra, Lancaster University Management School, King's College London, Universidade Nova de Lisboa, Warsaw School of Economics.
In Asia: National University of Singapore, Hong Kong University of Science and Technology, Chinese University of Hong Kong, Seoul National University, Peking University, Korea University, The Hong Kong Polytechnic University, City University of Hong Kong, Yonsei University, Keio University, Indian Institute of Management Bangalore, Indian Institute of Management Ahmedabad, Indian Institute of Management Calcutta, Singapore Management University, Nanyang Technological University.
In Latin America: Universidad Torcuato di Tella, Fundação Getúlio Vargas, Pontificia Universidad Católica de Chile, Universidad Adolfo Ibáñez, Instituto Tecnologico de Estudios Superiores Monterrey, Tecnológico de Monterrey, Universidad de Chile.
In Oceania: University of Melbourne, University of New South Wales, University of Sydney, Australian National University, Monash University, University of Queensland, University of Otago, Macquarie University, Victoria University of Wellington, Swinburne University.

Rankings 

Academic Ranking of World Universities (Shanghai Ranking)

In the 2020 Academic Ranking of World Universities, also known as Shanghai Ranking, CBS ranks #8 in Europe and #30 in the world in the category 'Management'. The ranking is research-focused as it is solely based on refereed research publications and research awards.

QS World University Ranking

In the 2020 QS ranking of the world's top universities for business and management, Copenhagen Business School ranks #15 in the world and #7 in Europe. This ranking aims to assess institutions’ overall performance and reputation in the business and management field (at both undergraduate and graduate level) and is headed by Harvard Business School, followed by INSEAD and London Business School.

Eduniversal

The French ratings agency Eduniversal ranked Copenhagen Business School the #1 business school in the world in 2014, ahead of London Business School and Harvard Business School. This ranking is based on the recommendations of deans and presidents of leading business schools from more than 150 countries. In 2020, Eduniversal ranked CBS as #1 business school in Western Europe, ahead of INSEAD and SDA Bocconi.

Corporate Knights

In the 2015 Better World MBA Ranking, which is published by Corporate Knights, the Copenhagen Business School MBA program ranks #3 globally.

QS Global MBA

The QS Global 200 Business School Report 2014/15 ranked the Copenhagen Business School MBA program #12 in Europe. The same report ranked the Copenhagen Business School MBA program in the top cluster of MBA programs globally. The top cluster, of four clusters total, comprises 20 North American MBA programs, 14 European MBA programs and 4 Asia Pacific MBA programs.

Bloomberg Businessweek

The Copenhagen Business School MBA program has been ranked #28 by Bloomberg Businessweek in its International Full-time MBA Ranking 2015. This ranking does not include the Business schools in the US.

Financial Times

The Financial Times ranked Copenhagen Business School #50 worldwide in its Masters in Management 2020 ranking. The Financial Times also ranked the CBS Executive MBA program #62 in the world and #31 in Europe in 2015. The Copenhagen Business School MBA program has been ranked in the Financial Times's list of Top 100 MBAs in 2021.

The Aspen Institute

The Aspen Institute's "Beyond Grey Pinstripes" bi-annual report ranked the Copenhagen Business School MBA program #43 globally (#7 in Europe) in its 2011-2012 report and #63 globally (#9 in Europe) in its 2009-2010 report.

Triple Crown of Accreditation

Copenhagen Business School is accredited by the Association to Advance Collegiate Schools of Business, the Association of MBAs, and the European Quality Improvement System. Copenhagen Business School and Aarhus University are the only two business schools in Denmark, and two of 57 business schools globally to earn Triple accreditation. Copenhagen Business School earned the AACSB accreditation in 2011, the AMBA accreditation in 2007 and the EQUIS accreditation in 2000. In 2015 CBS received the EQUIS seal of approval and thereby remains among the best 1% of business schools worldwide in terms of triple-crown accreditation.

Facilities

CBS Campus 
CBS is an urban university primarily located in four modern buildings in Frederiksberg, close to the center of Copenhagen. The main complex, Solbjerg Plads, was opened in 2000 and includes 34,000 m2 of student and office space surrounded by gardens and outdoor living space. Designed by Vilhelm Lauritzer Architects, the complex consists of interconnected concrete, glass and tile-sided buildings of varying heights that house student auditoriums, faculty office space, a cafeteria, the main library, a student bar and the campus bookstore.

Dalgas Have, opened in 1989 and designed by Henning Larsen Architects, is the oldest building currently in use. Owned by the Danish Pension Fund for Engineers and leased by CBS, the building includes 20,000 m2 of student classrooms, study space and offices distributed around a three-story 175 m long arcade. At the midpoint of the arcade a two-story semi-circular cafeteria sits below a semi-circular library.

Kilen (The Wedge) was opened in 2006 and includes 10,000 m2 of student classrooms, study spaces, and offices for research and administration. Designed by Lundgaard & Tranberg Architects, the four-story wedge-shaped building features a large oval-shaped atrium that extends the height of the building. The exterior is covered with full-story screens made of wood, matte glass or copper, which rotate in response to the Sun and weather. Kilen has been the recipient of numerous architecture and design awards such as a RIBA European Award in 2006.

Porcelænshaven, the fourth main building that comprises the CBS campus, is leased by CBS from the Danish Society for the Advancement of Business Education. Formerly the Royal Copenhagen Porcelain Factory, the factory has been converted into 20,000 m2 of student classrooms, study spaces, offices, and a student residence. A central feature of the building, a 1,000 m2 main hall used for large events, stands in the old location of the factory kiln hall. As part of the factory conversion, Henning Larsen Architects transformed the old raw material storage building into 3,800 m2 of modern study space.

CBS campus buildings reflect characteristic Scandinavian style and have been recognized by Frederiksberg Municipality earning an Award for Good and Beautiful Building in 2006 and 2009. The four main buildings are within walking distance and located along three consecutive stations on the Copenhagen Metro from Lindevang Station (Dalgas Have) to Frederiksberg Station (Solbjerg Plads).

Student facilities 
Student facilities include multimedia labs, interpretation labs, break-out rooms for group and project work, personal computers and Learning Resource Center. Computers are replaced with new models at least every third year. Plugs for portable laptops are readily available, and wireless connections are installed in the main buildings.

Student life

MarketingLab 
Founded in 2012, MarketingLab is an organization  driven by students who all share a common interest for creative marketing. The mission of the organization is to create a bridge between students and the industry. The team consists of the most ambitious students working on a weekly basis with events, courses and consulting.

CBS Sport 

CBS Sport is an independent sports organization belonging to CBS. Established in 2006, CBS Sport currently has 12 sports:

 Badminton
 Basketball (men and women)
 Cricket
 Floorball (men and women)
 Football (men and women)
 Handball (men and women)
 Horseback Riding
 Rugby (men and women)
 Running
 Skiing
 Tennis
 Volleyball (Mixed)

Notable alumni 

A
Sharmi Albrechtsen
B
Carl Frederik Waage Beck
Lene Børglum
Michael Brockenhuus-Schack
C
Tarja Cronberg
D
Jonas Deichmann
E
Jakob Ellemann-Jensen
H
David Heinemeier Hansson
K
Lise Kingo 
R
Kasper Rørsted
S
Fritz Schur
Søren Skou

See also 
 Copenhagen Consensus Centre
 Offshoring Research Network
 List of business schools in Europe
 List of universities and colleges in Denmark
 Open access in Denmark
 LiHE

References

External links 
Official site (in English)

 
Education in Copenhagen
Business schools in Denmark
Educational institutions established in 1917
1917 establishments in Denmark